A vicious circle (or cycle) is a complex chain of events that reinforces itself through a feedback loop, with detrimental results. It is a system with no tendency toward equilibrium (social, economic, ecological, etc.), at least in the short run.  Each iteration of the cycle reinforces the previous one, in an example of positive feedback. A vicious circle will continue in the direction of its momentum until an external factor intervenes to break the cycle. A well-known example of a vicious circle in economics is hyperinflation.

A virtuous circle is an equivalent system with a favorable outcome.

Examples

Vicious circles in the subprime mortgage crisis

The contemporary subprime mortgage crisis is a complex group of vicious circles, both in its genesis and in its manifold outcomes, most notably the late 2000s recession. A specific example is the circle related to housing. As housing prices decline, more homeowners go "underwater", when the market value of a home drops below that of the mortgage on it. This provides an incentive to walk away from the home, increasing defaults and foreclosures. This, in turn, lowers housing values further from over-supply, reinforcing the cycle.

The foreclosures reduce the cash flowing into banks and the value of mortgage-backed securities (MBS) widely held by banks. Banks incur losses and require additional funds, also called “recapitalization”. If banks are not capitalized sufficiently to lend, economic activity slows and unemployment increases, which further increase the number of foreclosures. Economist Nouriel Roubini discussed vicious circles in the housing and financial markets in interviews with Charlie Rose in September and October 2008.

Designing ecological virtuous circles
By involving all stakeholders in managing ecological areas, a virtuous circle can be created where improved ecology encourages the actions that maintain and improve the area.

Other
Other examples include the poverty cycle, sharecropping, and the intensification of drought. The recurring surges of the COVID-19 pandemic is a vicious circle on a global scale.

See also

 Catch-22 (logic)
 Causal loop diagram
 Chain reaction
 Cycle of poverty
 Cycle of violence
 Closed timelike curve
 Endogeneity (econometrics)				
 Positive feedback
 Rational addiction
 Reflexivity (sociology)
 Self-fulfilling prophecy
 Spiral of silence
 Unintended consequences

References

General and cited references 
 
 Rational Choice with Passion:Virtue in a Model of Rational Addiction – In this link the author uses Aristotelian virtue as a mediator between passion and reason in the construction of utility/consumption functions in an esoteric part of consumer behaviour theory related to decision making in addictive situations.
 China: A Stabilizing or Deflationary Influence in East Asia? The Problem of Conflicted Virtue – In this paper the author is using virtue in the sense of a positive outcome (balance of payments surplus) that conflicts with long term regional growth and stability.

External links 
 
 
 
 

Business cycle
Economic crises
Vicious circle